Thor DM-21 Agena-B or just Thor-Agena was a series of orbital launch vehicles. The rockets used the Douglas-built Thor first stage and the Lockheed-built Agena second stages. They are thus cousins of the more-famous Thor-Deltas, which founded the Delta rocket family. The first attempted launch of a Thor DM-21 Agena-B was in January 1959. The first successful launch was on 28 February 1959, launching Discoverer 17.

Launch statistics

Launch outcome

Launchpad

Orbit

Function

Launch history

References 

Lists of Thor launches
Lists of Thor and Delta launches
Lists of rocket launches